Dublin, Wicklow and Wexford Railway (DW&WR) 15 of 1860 was the first of a number of 0-4-2 tender locomotives built by Sharp Stewart who were the only supplier of the 0-4-2 type to the DW&WR.  In total 12 were supplied in batches in 1860, 1864 and 1876.

The 0-4-2 was considered a mixed-traffic type.  In practice the DW&WR mostly employed the locomotives with the higher tractive effort on main line freight and the others on mixed passenger/freight trains.

The 0-4-2s began to be made obsolete by the introduction of types such as the 0-6-0 and 2-6-0 in 1895, 1900 and 1922.

At least three were damaged beyond economic repair during the Irish Civil War, although there may be some claims some were simply life-expired.  One was still using a 4 wheel tender when withdrawn in 1923.  When the Dublin and South Eastern Railway (DSER)  Upon grouping into the Great Southern Railways most DSER were inspected or considered at Inchicore.  The resulting immediate cull of over twenty of the DSER's 67 locomotives included all remaining six or seven remaining 0-4-2 engines including the Civil War losses.

Notes and references

Notes

References

0-4-2 locomotives
5 ft 3 in gauge locomotives
Railway locomotives introduced in 1864
Scrapped locomotives
Steam locomotives of Ireland